Gold Coast Cops is an Australian factual television series on Network Ten. It follows the work of Queensland Police Service officers from the newly created Rapid Action & Patrols Group (RAP) on the Gold Coast in Queensland. The series was renewed for a second season in November 2014, returning 17 March 2015. The second season experienced a 3-month mid-season hiatus due to the seventh season of MasterChef Australia, however, returned on 2 August 2015 in the new timeslot of 7pm Sundays.

In September 2015 media reports emerged that Senior Constable Aaron Minns, who appeared in the program, was suspended from his position and charged with four counts of allegedly assaulting restrained prisoners. On Wednesday 4 May 2016, Minns was found not guilty on all charges, after a trial in the Brisbane Magistrates Court.

In November 2015, it was announced the series would not return.

In November 2020, rights to the series transferred to Nine Network and will begin airing reruns from 16 November 2020.

Episodes

Series overview

Season 1 (2014)

Season 2 (2015)

See also
Beach Cops
Kalgoorlie Cops
Territory Cops
The Force: Behind the Line
Highway Patrol (Australian TV series)
Border Security: Australia's Front Line
AFP

References

External links
 

Network 10 original programming
Australian factual television series
2014 Australian television series debuts
2015 Australian television series endings
Television shows set in Gold Coast, Queensland
Documentary television series about policing